Jonathan Dolan (born 19 December 1994) is an Irish badminton player. As a junior player, he was a champion at the 2012 Bulgarian and Irish Junior International Open badminton competition (U-19). In the senior event, he clinched the men's doubles title at the 2013 Irish Future Series tournament with his partner Sam Magee. Dolan also won the Irish National Badminton Championships in the men's singles and doubles event in 2014 and 2019. He entered the Badminton Europe Centre of Excellence (CoE) program in February 2018.

Achievements

BWF International Challenge/Series 
Men's singles

Men's doubles

  BWF International Challenge tournament
  BWF International Series tournament
  BWF Future Series tournament

References

External links 

 

1994 births
Living people
People from Sligo (town)
Irish male badminton players